The Politburo of the 27th Congress of the Communist Party of the Soviet Union was in session from 1986 to 1990.

Composition

Members

Candidates

References

Politburo of the Central Committee of the Communist Party of the Soviet Union members
1986 in the Soviet Union
1987 in the Soviet Union
1988 in the Soviet Union
1989 in the Soviet Union
1986 establishments in the Soviet Union
1990 disestablishments in the Soviet Union